Artus Henri Louis de la Panouse (19 September 1863, Paris – April 1944) was the President of the International Sporting Club of Monte Carlo.  In 1916 he proposed to form a baseball league in southern France.  He was a Colonel in the cavalry, later promoted to the rank of General de Brigade, and served as the Military Attaché to the French Embassy in London during World War One.

References

1863 births
1944 deaths
French generals